Glen Alice is a village in the Central West region of New South Wales, Australia. The village is located in the local government area of the City of Lithgow.

References

City of Lithgow